"Ooh Aah... Just a Little Bit" is the debut solo single of Australian singer Gina G. The song was written by British songwriters Simon Caldwell and Steve Rodway, and released on 25 March 1996 as the first single from her debut album, Fresh! (1997). It reached  1 on the UK Singles Chart almost two months later and was also a number-one hit in Israel, as well as in Scotland. In the US, the song peaked at No. 12 on the Billboard Hot 100. The song was the 's entry in the Eurovision Song Contest 1996, held in Oslo, Norway, where it finished in eighth place. It was successful on the charts in Europe, Australia and the US, and was nominated for the Grammy Award for Best Dance Recording.

Chart performance
"Ooh Aah... Just a Little Bit" initially entered the UK singles chart at  6 on Sunday 31 March and two weeks later climbed to No. 2. The song spent another five weeks in the top 3, climbing to No. 1 (in its 8th week) the day after Gina's performance at Eurovision, on 19 May and would spend a further 15 weeks in the top 75. As of 2022, the song is still the last Eurovision entry of the United Kingdom to peak at the top of the country's chart. In Israel the single reached No. 1. In Australia, Denmark, Hungary and Norway it peaked within the top 5. And in Belgium, Czech Republic, Finland, Ireland, Scotland and Sweden the song peaked within the top 10. On the European Eurochart Hot 100 it peaked at No. 9.

The song was also successful in the United States, a rarity for Eurovision entries. Released in the US in November 1996, it peaked at No. 12 on the Billboard Hot 100 in February 1997, and spent a total of 30 weeks on the Hot 100. It also reached No. 13 on the Rhythmic Top 40, No. 5 on the Mainstream Top 40, No. 25 on the Adult Top 40, No. 4 on the Hot Dance/Club Play Songs, and No. 11 on the Hot Dance Music/Maxi-Singles Sales chart. It is the fourth highest charting Eurovision entry in the US behind "Nel blu dipinto du blu (Volare)" (No. 1 in 1958), "Waterloo" (No. 6 in 1974) and "Eres tú" (No. 9 in 1974); it remained the last Eurovision entry to chart in the US until "Arcade", the  winning entry, did so (No. 30 in 2021).

Such was the song's success in the United States, it was nominated for a Grammy Award for Best Dance Recording at the 1998 Grammy Awards. In 2012, "Ooh Aah... Just a Little Bit" was ranked No. 45 in NME's list of the "50 best-selling tracks of the 90s", adding that the song sold 790,000.

Critical reception
Scottish Aberdeen Evening Express described the song as a "slice of cheesy Europop", adding that "you'll grow to either love or hate it!" AllMusic editor Stephen Thomas Erlewine called it a "great guilty pleasure". A reviewer from Austin American-Statesman viewed it as "perky". J. D. Considine from The Baltimore Sun said that from its Moog-style synthesizer hook to the galloping electrobeats that drive the chorus, Gina G's "Ooh Aah... Just a Little Bit" "is clearly a throwback to the sort of synth-pop that owned the airwaves in the late '80s." Larry Flick from Billboard wrote that "adorable Australian ingénue" has already enjoyed massive pop success throughout Europe with this "instantly infectious hi-NRG dance ditty. It's easy to predict this single scoring similarly high marks here, thanks in large part to her kewpiedoll vocals and the song's tasty, sugarcoated melody. You'll be singing along to the song's chorus before the track's close, while a bevy of meaty remixes will have you happily twitching around the room." Richard Paton from The Blade complimented it as a "smash", that "kicks off" the album of "vibrant dance pop". 

Swedish newspapers Expressen and Göteborgs-Tidningen called it a "sticky yummy pop pastry", and a "danceable naughty pop song".<ref>Göteborgs-Tidningen. 14 May 1996.</ref> L.A. Weekly wrote that it's "an expert confection of interlocking speed-stuttered repetitious-trance electro-breakdance beats, above which Gina G breathily metronomes too-childlike-to-be-suggestive "ooh ahh"s as if she were a Kit-Cat clock ticking and tocking its way to the bank, its Cheshire smile bursting with catnip." A reviewer from Music Week gave the song four out of five, adding that its "immediacy, jollity and credibility should stand it in good stead." NME described it as a "frenzy of techno-friendly tunefulness", remarking its "unshakeable" chorus. A reviewer from People Magazine noted that Gina G is adding a "dusky undercurrent and a teasing touch of sultriness" to the song. John Everson from SouthtownStar felt it should be the "dance club sensation of the year", describing it as "a pure hair-flipping bit of flirting, teasing fun. This is just the sort of fodder to form into a perfect pop hit". He also complimented its "Erasure-esque galloping beat". Charles Aaron from Spin called the song a "synthy magic carpet that flies nonstop to flashy, trashy Miami discos where they sell drinks with names like "Call a Cab"."

Retrospective response
In 2017, American entertainment company BuzzFeed ranked the song No. 25 in their list of "The 101 Greatest Dance Songs of the '90s". In an 2020 review, Can't Stop the Pop described it as a "rollicking tour-de-force" and "relentless, dizzying rush from start to finish". They stated that "the timing of Ooh Aah…Just A Little Bit was perfect; it bottled the Eurodance sound of the early '90s and siphoned it down into a traditionally structured pop song." In 2013, Tom Ewing of Freaky Trigger called it a "glossy hi-tack" song, adding further, "It's brisk, good-quality bubblegum: a springy keyboard part, a chugging rhythm, and a few fine lines – "Every night makes me hate the days" – laid down with enough conviction to cross the line between corny and effective." In another 2020 review, Pop Rescue complimented it as "incredibly catchy". In 2014, The Quietus named the song one of "50 Favourite Guilt-Free Pleasures". An editor, Dan Barrow, wrote that the song "enters the realms of unguilty pleasure mostly through its chorus, where the vocal drops registers of excitement to an almost-whisper, just as the arpeggios hit their peaks of Euro-trance intensity, the memory of house piano – the signifier of anticipation and release – leaking through the chorus. The high, almost toxic sheen of its opening fanfare of notes, a gateway drug to more louche pleasures."

Performance at Eurovision 1996 final

On the night of the Eurovision 1996 final – held on 18 May 1996 in Oslo Spektrum, Norway – "Ooh Aah... Just a Little Bit" was performed 2nd in a field of 23 songs being preceded by the  entry "Beşinci Mevsim", with the  entry "¡Ay, qué deseo!", following as the 3rd entry of Eurovision 1996. Conductor Ernie Dunstall orchestrated and conducted "Ooh Aah... Just a Little Bit" on stage with a minimal orchestral accompaniment. A tiny string accompaniment was added to the backing track produced by Rodway. Two female dancers dressed in pink and yellow backed up Gina G, dressed in a short thigh-skimming glittery metal dress. The dress was originally custom made for Cher by Paco Rabanne, but she left it unused hanging in the offices at Warner Bros. Records until Gina G stumbled across it just a few days before the contest. The dress was then shortened slightly for Ms G.

In 1996, the rules required every instrument used on the backing track to appear on stage. The backing track used for the UK entry relied heavily on computer generated sounds and techno beats. As a result, two Apple Mac personal computers were on the stage - one beside each synthesizer. United Kingdom and Gina G received 12 points from two countries: Portugal and Belgium. The song finished in 8th place overall, the winner being  with "The Voice", sung by Eimear Quinn. The result led to a big overhaul in the contest's voting system, with the introduction of televoting in several participating countries the following year, a practice rolled out across the board in 1998.

Music video
The song's music video was directed by Fruit Salad with photography directed by Peter Sinclair. It features Gina G with three background female dancers performing in a passageway with a brightly lit ceiling, teasing a pair of well-dressed guys. The song's lyrics are used in a sexually suggestive, but playful manner. While it had airtime on several music video channels globally, the video would also be the first song to be "banned" after being voted on by MTV's 12 Angry Viewers'' in 1998, despite never receiving much airtime on the US channel. MTV's sister channel VH1 gave the video more moderate airplay time.

Track listings

 UK CD1 and Australian CD single
 "Ooh Aah... Just a Little Bit" (Motiv8 radio edit) – 3:24
 "Ooh Aah... Just a Little Bit" (Motiv8 extended vocal mix) – 6:43
 "Ooh Aah... Just a Little Bit" (The Next Room's Rip 'Em Up mix) – 6:08
 "Ooh Aah... Just a Little Bit" (Motiv8 Vintage Honey mix) – 6:46
 "Ooh Aah... Just a Little Bit" (The Next Room's Pukka Dub mix) – 6:08

 UK CD2
 "Ooh Aah... Just a Little Bit" (Eurovision Song Contest version) – 3:00
 "Ooh Aah... Just a Little Bit" (Motiv8 Vintage Honey mix) – 6:46
 "Ooh Aah... Just a Little Bit" (Jon of the Pleased Wimmin Chase the Space mix) – 7:40
 "Ooh Aah... Just a Little Bit" (The Next Room's Pukka Dub mix) – 5:00
 "Ooh Aah... Just a Little Bit" (Motiv8 extended vocal mix) – 6:43
 "Ooh Aah... Just a Little Bit" (Jon of the Pleased Wimmin Face the Bass mix) – 7:40

 UK 12-inch single
A1. "Ooh Aah... Just a Little Bit" (Motiv8 extended vocal mix) – 6:43
A2. "Ooh Aah... Just a Little Bit" (Motiv8 Vintage Honey mix) – 6:46
AA1. "Ooh Aah... Just a Little Bit" (Jon of the Pleased Wimmin Chase the Space mix) – 7:40
AA2. "Ooh Aah... Just a Little Bit" (Jon of the Pleased Wimmin Face the Bass mix) – 7:40

 UK cassette single and European CD single
 "Ooh Aah... Just a Little Bit" (Motiv8 radio edit) – 3:25
 "Ooh Aah... Just a Little Bit" (Motiv8 extended vocal mix) – 6:43

 US CD, 7-inch, and cassette single
 "Ooh Aah... Just a Little Bit" (Motiv8 radio edit) – 3:24
 "Ooh Aah... Just a Little Bit" (Eurovision Song Contest version) – 3:02

 US maxi-CD single
 "Ooh Aah... Just a Little Bit" (Motiv8 radio edit) – 3:24
 "Ooh Aah... Just a Little Bit" (Jon of the Pleased Wimmin Chase the Space mix) – 7:52
 "Ooh Aah... Just a Little Bit" (The Next Room's Rip 'Em Up mix) – 6:08
 "Ooh Aah... Just a Little Bit" (Motiv8 Vintage Honey mix) – 6:46
 "Ooh Aah... Just a Little Bit" (Jon of the Pleased Wimmin Face the Bass mix) – 7:52
 "Ooh Aah... Just a Little Bit" (The Next Room's Pukka Dub mix) – 6:08
 "Ooh Aah... Just a Little Bit" (Motiv8 extended vocal mix) – 6:42

 US 12-inch single
A1. "Ooh Aah... Just a Little Bit" (Motiv8 Vintage Honey mix) – 6:42
A2. "Ooh Aah... Just a Little Bit" (The Next Room's Rip 'Em Up mix) – 6:08
A3. "Ooh Aah... Just a Little Bit" (The Next Room's Pukka Dub mix) – 6:08
B1. "Ooh Aah... Just a Little Bit" (Jon of the Pleased Wimmin Chase the Space mix) – 7:52
B2. "Ooh Aah... Just a Little Bit" (Jon of the Pleased Wimmin Face the Bass mix) – 7:52

Charts and certifications

Weekly charts

Year-end charts

Certifications

Release history

References

1996 songs
1996 debut singles
Eurovision songs of 1996
Eurovision songs of the United Kingdom
Gina G songs
Number-one singles in Israel
Number-one singles in Scotland
UK Singles Chart number-one singles
Warner Records singles